was a Japanese court noble, and an important supporter of the Southern Court during the Nanboku-chō Wars. His father was Kitabatake Akinobu.

His kami is enshrined at Ryōzen Shrine in Date, Fukushima Prefecture, which is one of the Fifteen Shrines of the Kenmu Restoration.

External links
Japanese biographical account

Kuge